Mamasani Luri (Luri: لوری ممسنی) is one of the sub-dialects of the Southern Luri dialect of the Luri language. It is spoken by Mamasani Lurs.

See also 

 Bakhtiari dialect

References

Southwestern Iranian languages